National is an unincorporated community and census-designated place (CDP) in Allegany County, Maryland, United States. As of the 2010 census it had a population of 56.

Demographics

References

Census-designated places in Allegany County, Maryland
Census-designated places in Maryland